The Executive Secretary of the United States Department of State is the Director of the Executive Secretariat. The position holds a rank equivalent to an Assistant Secretary. Each Executive Secretary is appointed by the Secretary of State.

The Executive Secretary serves as the liaison and the clearinghouse between the State Department’s bureaus and the leadership offices of the Secretary, the Deputy Secretaries, and the Director of Policy Planning. The Executive Secretary also manages relations between the State Department and the White House, the National Security Council, and other cabinet-level agencies. As the head of the Executive Secretariat, the Executive Secretary also manages the State Department's Operations Center and prepares briefing papers about the Department during transitions between presidential administrations.

List of Executive Secretaries

References

External links
 

 
1961 establishments in Washington, D.C.